Elections to the French National Assembly were held in Mauritania on 10 November 1946. Previously Mauritania had elected MPs in a single joint constituency with neighbouring Senegal, but the new 1946 constitution had separated the two territories politically, giving Mauritania one seat in the Assembly. The result was a victory for Horma Ould Babana, a member of the French Section of the Workers' International. His opponents were Yvon Razac, a member of the MRP and the candidate favored by the French government and traditional Moorish leaders, and Souleymane Diop, an independent.

Results

References

Mauritania
1946 in Mauritania
Elections in Mauritania
November 1946 events in Africa